The Ukrainian city of Chernivtsi is/was home to many people. The following is a list of people from Chernivtsi.

Natives
Sophia Agranovich, American classical concert pianist, Centaur Records recording artist and music educator
Aharon Appelfeld (1932–2018), Jewish writer
Ninon Ausländer (1895–1966), art historian and wife of Hermann Hesse
Rose Ausländer (1901–1988), Jewish German-language writer
Elyakim Badian (1925–2000), Israeli politician
Charles K. Bliss (1897–1985), inventor of Bliss-Symbole
Ion Bostan (1914–1992), Romanian film director
Octav Botnar (1913–1998), Romanian businessman, philanthropist, billionaire
Josef Burg (1912–2009), last Yiddish poet in Czernowitz
Paul Celan (born Antschel; 1920–1970), Romanian-born, German-language writer, poet and translator
Erwin Chargaff (1905–2002), Jewish biochemist
Eugen Ehrlich (1862–1922), Jewish jurist
Natalia Fedner, American fashion designer, inventor and actress
Rudolf Gerlach-Rusnak (1895–1960), German operatic and concert lyrical tenor
Radu Grigorovici (1911–2008), Romanian physicist
Constantin Ritter von Isopescu-Grecul (or cavaler de Isopescu-Grecul; 1871–1938), Austro-Hungarian-born Romanian jurist, politician and journalist
Frederick John Kiesler (1890–1965), theater designer, artist, theoretician and architect
Ruth Klieger Aliav (born Polishuk; 1914–1979), Romanian-Israeli Jewish activist
Sam Kogan (1946–2004), stage director, actor and founding principal of the Academy of the Science of Acting and Directing in London
Mila Kunis (b. 1983), actress
Eusebius Mandyczewski (1857–1929), Romanian musicologist, composer (Greek Orthodox)
Itzik Manger (1901–1969), Jewish writer, who wrote in Yiddish
Georg Marco (1863–1923), Romanian chess-player and author
Volodymyr Melnykov (b. 1951), Ukrainian poet, writer, songwriter, composer and public figure, Merited Figure of Arts of Ukraine
Jan Mikulicz-Radecki (1850–1905), Polish surgeon
Dan Pagis (1930–1986), Israeli writer
Iacob Pistiner, lawyer and Member of the Romanian Parliament in the interwar years
Traian Popovici (1892–1946), Romanian lawyer, mayor of Chernivtsi and Righteous Among the Nations
Markus Reiner (1886–1976), one of the founders of rheology
Gregor von Rezzori (born d'Arezzo; 1914–1998), Austrian Romanian German-language writer of Sicilian origin
Ludwig Rottenberg (real name: Lazăr) (1864–1932), conductor and composer
Ze'ev Sherf (1904–1984), Israeli Minister of Finance
Viorica Ursuleac (1894–1985), Romanian opera singer (dramatic soprano)
Richard M. Weiner (1930–2020), Romanian, later German theoretical physicist 
Mariya Yaremchuk, Ukrainian pop singer
Arseniy Yatsenyuk (b. 1974), lawyer, politician and Prime Minister of Ukraine from 2014 to 2016
Frederic Zelnik (1885–1950), important German silent movie director-producer, born in Czernowitz

Residents
 Hermann Bahr (1863–1934), Austrian writer, playwright, director and critic
 Grigore Vasiliu Birlic (1905–1970), Romanian actor of theater and cinema
 Nathan Birnbaum (1864–1937), Austrian writer and journalist, Jewish thinker and nationalist
 Mihai Eminescu (1850–1889), the most famous and influential Romanian poet
 Iancu Flondor (1865–1924), Austro-Hungarian-born ethnic Romanian activist who advocated Bukovina's union with the Kingdom of Romania
 Karl Emil Franzos (1848–1904), Jewish writer and publicist, grew up in Czernowitz and wrote a literary memorial of the Jewish ghetto, The Jews of Barnow
 Gala Galaction, originally Grigore Pisculescu (1879–1961), Romanian writer
 Ion Grămadă (1886–1917), Austro-Hungarian-born Romanian writer, historian and journalist
 Eudoxiu Hurmuzachi (1812–1874), Romanian historian, politician
 Volodymyr Ivasyuk (1949–1979), Ukrainian songwriter, composer and poet
 Joseph Kalmer (1898–1959), Austrian writer, poet and translator
 Olha Kobylyanska (1863–1942), Ukrainian modernist writer and feminist
 Zvi Laron (b. 1927), Israeli paediatric endocrinologist
 Anastasiya Markovich (b. 1979), Ukrainian painter
 Miron Nicolescu (1903–1975), Romanian mathematician
 Ion Nistor (1876–1962), Romanian historian and politician
 Israel Polack (1909–1993), Austro-Hungarian-born Romanian, Chilean and Israeli textile industrialist
 Ciprian Porumbescu (1853–1883), Romanian composer
 Aron Pumnul (1818–1866), Romanian philologist and teacher, national and revolutionary activist in Transylvania and Bukovina
 Wilhelm Reich (1897–1957), Jewish psychoanalyst and sexologist, born in Dobrzanica, went to school in Czernowitz
 Eugenia de Reuss Ianculescu (1865–1938), Romanian teacher, writer and women's rights activist
 Eric Roll (1907–2005), British academic economist, public servant and banker
 Sofia Rotaru (b. 1947), pop singer
 Maximilien Rubel (1905–1996), Marxist historian and council communist
 Wojciech Rubinowicz (1889–1974), Polish theoretical physicist
 Josef Schmidt (1904–1942), singer, actor and cantor
 Joseph Schumpeter (1883–1950), economist and Minister of Finance, 1909–1911 professor in Czernowitz
 Eliezer Steinbarg (Shtaynbarg; 1880–1932), Romanian teacher and Yiddish poetic fabulist
 Wilhelm Stekel (1868–1940), Jewish psychoanalyst and sexologist, born in Boiany, Bukovina, grew up in Czernowitz and attended the Gymnasium (grammar school)
 Vasile Tărâțeanu (1945–2022), journalist and writer
 Nazariy Yaremchuk (1951–1995), Hutsul Ukrainian singer

References

Chernivtsi